

Theo-Helmut Lieb (25 November 1889 – 20 March 1981) was a general in the Wehrmacht of Nazi Germany who held several divisional commands during World War II. He was a recipient of the  Knight's Cross of the Iron Cross with Oak Leaves.

Awards and decorations

 Knight's Cross of the Iron Cross with Oak Leaves
 Knight's Cross on 7 February 1944 as Generalleutnant and commander of XXXXII. Armeekorps
 400th Oak Leaves on 18 February 1944 as Generalleutnant and commander of XXXXII. Armeekorps

References

Citations

Bibliography

 

1889 births
1981 deaths
People from Freudenstadt
Lieutenant generals of the German Army (Wehrmacht)
German Army personnel of World War I
Recipients of the clasp to the Iron Cross, 1st class
Recipients of the Knight's Cross of the Iron Cross with Oak Leaves
German prisoners of war in World War II held by the United States
People from the Kingdom of Württemberg
Military personnel from Baden-Württemberg
German Army generals of World War II